is an anime series based on the video game Disgaea: Hour of Darkness. Makai Senki Disgaea follows the same general plot as the game, but with several alterations to character roles and the chronology of events. The anime was licensed by Geneon Entertainment before they closed their doors in 2007. On September 1, 2010, North American anime distributor Funimation announced that they had rescued the series, and they released the complete series in 2011.

A bonus feature on the DVD of Disgaea 2: Cursed Memories was a trailer of what the Disgaea anime would look like. However, the anime turned out to be completely different from what was shown in the trailer. No explanation was given for the drastic departure of the final anime from the trailer. A preview of the Disgaea anime was also available on another Geneon anime DVD, Hellsing Ultimate OVA I.

Makai Senki Disgaea is also the title of several distinct manga and light novel series based on the Disgaea game series.

Plot

The angel apprentice Flonne is sent from her homeland of Celestia to the Netherworld with a mission to assassinate King Krichevskoy, the ruler of the Netherworld. However, when she arrives at the overlord's castle, it is engulfed in flames. For the next two years, Flonne searches for her target, narrowing her search to a local dump. She finds a coffin with Krichevskoy's emblem on it and tries to carry out the assassination. However, it turns out that it is not Krichevskoy, but his son Laharl. After learning that his father has died, Laharl set out to claim the title of overlord for himself. Flonne and another demon by the name of Etna followed after him.

Main characters

Two years after the death of his father, King Krichevskoy, Laharl was awakened with the ambition to become the next Overlord of the Netherworld. Laharl is an extremely self-centered individual and insists that he is evil with great fervor, but he occasionally fails to hide his compassion, invariably leading to much teasing on the part of his vassals, Etna in particular. Laharl is very insecure with his emotions and believes that they are signs of a weakness that Demons should not have. As such, he always responds to his vassal's taunts with an adamant refusal of any kindness in his heart, usually accompanied by a rather unneeded show of force. Despite his rather slim and childlike frame, Laharl possesses immense physical strength, as well as powerful magic, and often displays his power in excess to enforce his authority over his vassals, intimidate his opponents, or when he's outraged. He is ruthless in battle and thinks nothing of the life of his opponent until they are at his mercy. He also has an irrational fear of sexy women. In the end, Laharl starts to understand what Flonne meant by love. When she is turned into a flower as punishment by Seraph Lamington, Laharl gives up his life. He is then reincarnated as a Prinny.

Flonne is an angel apprentice from the angel populated Celestia and a strong believer of love who is sent to the Netherworld by Seraph Lamington - (the ruler of Celestia) to assassinate King Krichevskoy, only to find out that he is already deceased. When she learns of Laharl's refusal to believe in love, she becomes Laharl's follower in order to find the good in him. She is very naive and can go on the same topic for a while. She worries about everyone, but doesn't seem too hesitant to take down a necessary opponent.

, Kate Higgins (English trailer)
Etna is Laharl's subordinate. Though she seems to serve him faithfully, she has her own secret agenda. She previously served the late King Krichevskoy. Though she made a promise to the king to protect Laharl, though she doesn't respect him as a superior. She herself desires to be the Overlord. She seems to be extremely reluctant to assume the role of Overlord when Laharl named her as his successor before destroying his existence to save Flonne.

Vyers is a self-proclaimed "rival" of Laharl. He calls himself "The Count of Beauty" or "Dark Adonis", but Laharl and others refer to him simply as "Mid Boss", much to his chagrin. He seems to know when and where to appear whenever Laharl is in a jam or when he simply wants to challenge Laharl. It is hinted that he is Laharl's father.

Prinnies are human souls sewn into penguin-like beings with demon wings and pouches. They do hard labor for very little pay as punishment for the evil deeds they have done on Earth. Etna hires an army of Prinnies who tend not to listen to her until she threatens to hurt them, although she often does so anyway.

Seraph Lamington is the kind soft-spoken leader of Celestia. He is the angel responsible for sending Flonne down to the Netherworld to assassinate King Krichevskoy. He never raises his voice even when giving out orders.

, Jamieson Price (English trailer)
Captain Gordon is the 37th Defender of Earth. He has an assistant named Jennifer and a robot named Thursday, and with them he explores space and assaults evil doers. He is very loyal to angels even going as far as bowing and kneeling for them, but demons are automatically considered targets by him.

Jennifer is Captain Gordon's assistant. Despite her sexy appearance, she is a scientist with a Ph.D. She is Thursday's creator.

Thursday is the robotic member of Captain Gordon's team. It is the information station of the group, responsible for analyzing and fixing things. He can also transform into various weapons.

Kurtis is another human from Earth who works under General Carter and the Earth Defense Force like Gordon. He also suffered a traumatic experience, in which a group of terrorists destroyed the building where he and his family were in.

Theme songs

 Opening theme: "Aishitageru" (愛したげる)
Performed by: LOVERIN TAMBURIN
Lyrics and composition by: aya.
Arrangement by: AKIHIRO

 Ending theme: "Kusari" (鎖り)
Vocals and composition by: Akiko Kawakami
Lyrics by: Hiiro Misaki
Arrangement by: Katsu Takahashi

Episode list

Other Disgaea media

Disgaea novels- A set of novels written by Sow Kanimiso and illustrated by Chou Niku (although they were aided by Takehito Harada in the beginning) These novels begin with a novelization of the first game and then continues the story ten years later. The novels introduce many new characters including Laharl's relatives, Flonne's family, and Gordon and Jennifer's daughter. While it is unknown if the novels are considered canon, it can fit alongside Disgaea and Disgaea 2 in the canon due to the placement of the novel's plot (Disgaea 2 takes place only three years after the game, whereas the Disgaea novels are placed ten years after the first game.) Currently, there are six novels: Enter the Maoh, Revelation, Returned, On Love part 1 and part 2, and Battle of the Maoh (which also feature appearances by Zetta, Pram, Salome, and King Drake from Makai Kingdom) Laharl, Etna, and Flonne also appear in all other Nippon Ichi novels. This includes the Phantom Brave and Makai Kingdom novels. Recently, a novel for Disgaea 2 has been released.
Disgaea manga- While not necessarily canon, the Disgaea manga illustrated by Arashi Shindo follows the basic storyline. Many events in the manga, while similar, have been altered completely and the humor is a lot more random. (i.e. Laharl, Etna, and Flonne begin to believe that Mid Boss is a pedophile due to his recurring presence among the three) Many characters also appear to have different personalities (i.e. on occasion, Lamington will be seen baking a cake). The art style is also very different as many of the characters appear somewhat more mature and the art is very shōjo-like. Broccoli Books released the manga in September 2006. Disgaea 2 Volume 1 was released February 2007, and the subsequent Volume 2 in July 2007.

Reception
On Anime News Network, Theron Martin gave the anime an overall grade of C−, saying that "on the balance [...] this is a wholly forgettable effort."

References

External links
 

Anime television series based on video games
Comedy anime and manga
Disgaea
Enterbrain manga
Fantasy anime and manga
Funimation
Geneon USA
Ichijinsha manga
Japanese fantasy novels
Madman Entertainment anime
Manga based on video games
MediaWorks (publisher)
OLM, Inc.
Television series about demons

ja:魔界戦記ディスガイア
pt:Makai Senki Disgaea
fi:Disgaea